Lyonpo Khandu Wangchuk (born 24 November 1950 in Paro) is a political figure in Bhutan. He graduated from St. Stephen's College, University of Delhi. He was Chairman of the council (Prime Minister) from 2001 until 2002. On 7 September 2006, he became Prime Minister again; he was then replaced by Kinzang Dorji on 2 August 2007, after Wangchuk resigned to participate in the 2008 election as a member of the Druk Phuensum Tshogpa (DPT) political party. He also served as Minister of Foreign Affairs from 2003 to 2007.

Following the DPT's victory in the March 2008 election, Wangchuk became Minister of Economic Affairs on April 11, 2008.

Honours
  :
  The Royal Red Scarf (March 1987).
  The Royal Orange Scarf (January 1994).

References

External links
2006 UN General Assembly address

1950 births
Living people
People from Paro District
St. Stephen's College, Delhi alumni
Prime Ministers of Bhutan
Foreign ministers of Bhutan
21st-century Bhutanese politicians
Druk Phuensum Tshogpa politicians
Bhutanese politicians
Bhutanese MNAs 2013–2018
Bhutanese MNAs 2008–2013
Druk Phuensum Tshogpa MNAs